Makoto Hasebe ( Hasebe Makoto; 17 February 1951 – 12 February 2022) was a Japanese politician.

An independent, he served as mayor of Yurihonjō from 2009 to 2021. He died on 12 February 2022, at the age of 70.

References

1951 births
2022 deaths
20th-century Japanese politicians
21st-century Japanese politicians
Mayors of places in Japan
Doshisha University alumni
People from Yurihonjō
People from Akita Prefecture